Elanora State High School is the high school serving the Elanora area of the Gold Coast, Queensland, Australia.  Founded in 1990, it currently has a student body of 950.

Music department 
The school offers music lessons to all interested students attending the school on both Concert Band instruments (woodwind, percussion and brass) as well String Ensemble instruments (Violin, Viola, Cello and Double Bass). These bands rehearse during and after school mid-week and perform at many of the school functions including ANZAC Day, Academic Awards Evenings and Career Expo, as well as at external inter-school competitions (Gold Coast Eisteddfod and Fanfare).

As well as instrumental music lessons, Elanora High regularly has a full complement of music classes from year 7 through to year 12. Accompanying this strong showing, the bi-annual school musical regularly features musically talented students.

Notable people
Operator Please were a band that originally came from Elanora High. Members having attended Elanora High include Amandah Wilkinson, Ashley McConnell, Timothy Commandeur, and Sarah Gardiner. The band previously toured the UK, Europe and the US, and had a Top 20 ARIA Chart hit "Just a Song About Ping Pong" off their album "Yes Yes Vindictive". The band won 'Best Pop Release' ARIA for their single "Just a Song About Ping Pong".

Dane Lovett is a contemporary artist currently based in Brisbane, Queensland. A notable event in his career was the creation of the artwork for Eskimo Joe's album Black Fingernails, Red Wine and subsequent singles. He was nominated for Best Cover Art in the ARIA Music Awards of 2006 for his work on Black Fingernails, Red Wine.

Australian model Maddison Gabriel studied at Elanora State High School.

The Voice Season 7 contestant Chang Po Ching attended Elanora State High School from 2004 to 2008.

Australian Air Force Cadets
No. 213 Squadron Australian Air Force Cadets parade on the school grounds throughout the year.

See also 
 List of schools in Queensland

References

External links 
 School website
 Elanora State High School School Overview

Public high schools in Queensland
Schools on the Gold Coast, Queensland
Educational institutions established in 1990
1990 establishments in Australia